The 1994 German Athletics Championships was the 94th edition of the national championship in outdoor track and field for Germany. It was held on 1–3 July at the Steigerwaldstadion in Erfurt. It served as the selection meeting for Germany at the 1994 European Athletics Championships.

In the women's triple jump, Helga Radtke achieved a new German record with a mark of 14.46 m – a record which went unbeaten until 13 June 2011. The men's half marathon was won by Salvatore Di Dio in 1:04:06, but he was not elected senior national champion as he had only registered for the junior race.

Championships
As usual, due to time or organizational reasons, various competitions were not held as part of the main event in Erfurt. The annual national championships in Germany held separately from the main track and field competition comprised the following:

Results

Men

Women

References

Results
 German Athletics Champions . sport-komplett.de
 Results of the German Marathon Championship 1925 to 2012 . Marathonspiegel.
 Results of the 1994 100K German Championship . DUV Ultramarathon-Statistik.

External links 
 Official website of the German Athletics Association 

1994
Sports competitions in Thuringia
Sport in Erfurt
Athletics Championships
German Championships
Athletics Championships